Mark Reynolds/North Mobile County Airport  is a privately owned public-use airport in Mobile County, Alabama, United States. It is located three nautical miles (4 mi, 6 km) northeast of the central business district of Creola, Alabama.

Facilities and aircraft 
Mark Reynolds/North Mobile County Airport covers an area of 40 acres (16 ha) at an elevation of 60 feet (18 m) above mean sea level. It has one runway designated 3/21 with a turf surface measuring 2,000 by 180 feet (610 x 55 m).

For the 12-month period ending May 5, 2010, the airport had 8,570 aircraft operations, an average of 23 per day: 86% general aviation and 14% military. At that time there were 10 aircraft based at this airport, all single-engine.

References

External links 
 Aerial image as of 15 February 1997 from USGS The National Map

Airports in Mobile County, Alabama
Privately owned airports